Manchester United is a football video game series licensed by Manchester United, which was highly popular in the early 1990s.

Games 
Game series programmed by Krisalis ordered by release date:

 Manchester United (1990)
 Manchester United Europe (1991)
 Manchester United: Premier League Champions (1994)
 Manchester United Premier League Champions 1994-95 Season Data Disk (1994)
Manchester United: The Double (1995)
 Manchester United Championship Soccer (1995)

Game series programmed by Codemasters, ordered by release date:

 Manchester United: Club Football (2003)
 Manchester United Manager 2005 (2004)
 Manchester United: Club Football 2005 (Manchester United Soccer in North America) (2004)

References

External links 
 Manchester United series at uvlist.net
 Manchester United at ysrnry.co.uk
 Manchester United at cpcrulez.free.fr
 Manchester United at generation-msx.ml

Association football video games
Manchester United F.C. media
1990 video games
1991 video games
1994 video games
2004 video games
2005 video games
Video game sequels
Acorn Archimedes games
Amstrad CPC games
Commodore 64 games
Krisalis Software games
ZX Spectrum games
MSX games
Amiga games
Amiga CD32 games
PlayStation 2 games
Xbox games
Video games developed in the United Kingdom